Genertel is an Italian insurance company based in Trieste, Italy. It's the first online insurance company in Italy.
Part of the Generali Group since its foundation, from 2013 Genertel has been headed by Generali Italia.

History
Genertel was founded in Trieste in July 1994; it is the first company in Italy to provide financial services by telephone.
In 1998 only five insurance companies were authorized to operate by telephone in Italy; among these, Genertel was the first in terms of premium amount and number of customers (more than 100,000).
In 1999 Genertel was the first direct insurance in Italy to offer the possibility of taking out policies on the Internet. 
In 2005 Davide Passero became CEO of Genertel for almost a decade, until 2014 when he joined Alleanza Assicurazioni.

In June 2009, Generali Italia launched Genertellife, the first online life insurance company in Italy, as an extension of Genertel.

In 2014 there is a change at the top, Passero leaves the management of the company to Manlio Lostuzzi.

In 2019, Genertel was authorized by IVASS (Institute for the Supervision of Insurance) to operate also in the credit sector, where the company aims at the sector of the salary- or pension-backed loans.

On 1 September 2019 Maurizio Pescarini became CEO.

In 2020, to counter the emergency linked to the COVID-19 pandemic, Genertel launches "Genertel Everywhere" a completely remote contact center available 24 hours a day.

References

External links

Financial services companies established in 1994
Italian companies established in 1994
Insurance companies of Italy
Generali Italia
Online insurance companies